Tienhovenselaan is a RandstadRail stop in Den Haag, the Netherlands.

History

The station is a stop for lines 4 and 6 and is located on the Escamplaan. Passengers should change here between lines 4 and 6.

RandstadRail services
The following services currently call at Tienhovenselaan:

Tram Services

Gallery

RandstadRail stations in The Hague